Blumenthaler SV is a German association football club from Blumenthal, the northernmost district of the city of Bremen. The club was established 6 June 1919 as Blumenthaler Sportverein by former members of Blumenthaler Fußballverein 1912. FV was the successor to Spiel- und Sport Blumenthal and is part of the historical tradition of SG Aumund-Vegesack, which is still active today. As a worker's club, SV was part of the Arbeiter-Turn- und Sportbund (ATSB) in the 1920s and early 1930s. The first men's soccer team plays in the fifth-class "Bremen Liga".



History

Formation to WWII
The ATSB was one of several leagues separate from mainstream competition active in Germany in the interwar period, each of which staged its own national championship. In 1932, the club captured the regional Nordwestdeutschland crown and then advanced as far as the semifinals where they were put out by eventual champions TuS Nürnberg-Ost (4–1). The following year, BSV was banned as politically unpalatable by the Nazi regime, alongside other left-leaning workers' and faith-based clubs.

The club was soon reformed as Allgemeiner Sport-Verein Blumenthal von 1919 and, in 1937, qualified to play in the Gauliga Niedersachsen, one of 13 regional first division circuits established in the 1933 reorganization of German football. They remained part of Gauliga competition throughout the course of World War II, but earned only mid-to-lower table results until finishing as vice-champions in the war weakened Gauliga Weser-Ems in 1944. The following season was cut short after just four games by the collapse of Nazi Germany. ASV made two appearances in play for the Tschammer-Pokal, predecessor to the modern day DFB-Pokal (German Cup), going out against Polizei Hamburg in 1939, and against Dresdner SC in the second round in 1940, having beaten Hamburger SV in the first round.

Postwar to the 1980s
Following the war, the team took on its current name and became part of the Amateurliga Bremen (II) where they captured three consecutive divisional titles from 1950 to 1952. However, BSV failed to advance in each of its subsequent attempts to qualify for the Oberliga Nord (I). The team continued to field strong sides through the 1950s and on into the late 1970s. In 1963, the Amateurliga became a third tier circuit with the formation of the new national first division Bundesliga and the two Regionalliga (II). Despite another four divisional titles and participation in qualification play for the Regionalliga Nord (II) the team was unable to advance. In 1977, BSV crashed out following a 16th-place finish. They made single season cameo appearances in the Amateuroberliga Nord (III) in 1979–80 and the Oberliga Niedersachsen (III) in 1997–98.

The team returned to national cup play in the 1970s with first round appearances in 1974–75, 1975–76, 1977–78, 1978–79 and 1980–81. They also took part in the opening rounds of the national amateur championship in 1955, 1965, 1974, and 1976, without any success.

Since 2005 
In 2006 the first team won the 18th LOTTO Masters for the Haake Beck Cup (today: LOTTO Masters for the Sparkasse Bremen Cup) in today's Bremen ÖVB Arena against Werder Bremen's U23. In 2015, today's LOTTO Masters was won again. This time the rival Bremer SV was beaten in the final. In 2014, 2016, 2018 and 2020 the entry into the DFB Cup was missed after the Blumenthalers lost the finals for the "Lotto Pokal". In the first two finals, Bremer SV won 1–0 and 3–0 respectively, while in 2018 BSC Hastedt got the upper hand 3–0. In 2020, the Blumenthaler SV failed after a 2–2 draw in regular time on penalties with 5–5 at the Bremen champions and regional league promoted FC Oberneuland.

Honours
The club's honours:
 Bremen-Liga (Tiers II-V)
 Champions: 1950, 1951, 1952, 1959, 1964, 1972, 1973, 1974, 1979, 1989, 1997
 Landesliga Bremen (VI)
 Champions: 2005
 Bremer Pokal (Tiers III-VI)
 Winners: 1953, 1960, 1963, 1965, 1970, 1974, 1977, 1978
Participants in the DFB Cup and Tschammer Pokal: 
1939, 1940, 1974/75, 1975/76, 1977/78, 1978/79, 1980/81

Youth teams 
The Blumenthaler SV is known beyond the Bremen state borders for its youth work. For example, the Gambian refugee Ousman Manneh and Sören Seidel, two SV Werder Bremen players, have emerged from the “Burgwall”. Other well-known names from the Blumenthal youth department are those of SC Freiburg professional Lucas Höler, and that of long-time youth coach Michael Kniat who initially trained the U23 of the second division SC Paderborn 07 and is now part of the first team's coaching staff. In January 2021, Kebba Badjie also signed his professional contract with Werder Bremen, the Gambier played for the Blumenthaler U19 in the Regionalliga Nord (II).

U19 
In 2011, the A-youth succeeded in promotion to the Regionalliga Nord and in the following season for the first time they were relegated to the second-highest German youth division. The A-Juniors played there 6 seasons until the 2017–18 season. In the 2019–20 season, the 1st A-Juniors will play in the Bremen Association League (III).

U17 
In 2010, the B-youth rose to the Regionalliga Nord. The B-Juniors were relegated from the Regionalliga Nord after only one season, before being promoted again in 2014 and relegated directly to relegation in 2015. In the 2020–21 season, the 1st B-Juniors play in the Bremen Association League and, after 6 games, took first place in accordance with the quotient rule and were named champions by the Bremen FV. After the team was refused promotion by the North German Football Association, Blumenthaler SV is examining legal means. In 2022 the team made the promotion to Regionalliga Nord.

U15 
The C-Juniors also managed to get promoted to the Regionalliga Nord, where the Blumenthal boys played in the 2013–14 season and since summer 2019, after the promotion could be realized again. Until the season was broken off due to the corona pandemic, the team of head coach Peter Moussalli surprised in the top German division, so that after calculating the point quotient as fourth in the table, relegation was safely achieved. In the 2021–22 season, the C Juniors will play their third season in a row in Germany's top division.

Other teams

Women's teams 
Blumenthaler SV has two women's teams. The 1st women's team celebrated promotion to the Bremen Association League (IV) for the 2019–20 season.

The captain of the 1st women's team, Melanie Rethmeyer, was awarded as third place in the "LOTTO Masters for the Sparkasse Bremen Cup" in the election for the Bremen amateur soccer player of the year 2019.

Senior football 
In 2012, the over-32 senior team in Neuler won the 7th German Senior Supercup, the unofficial German championship. In 2013 the title defense in Neubrandenburg at the 8th German Altherren-Supercup was only just missed, the final was lost 5–4 on penalties against VfB Lübeck.

On June 11 and 12, 2022, the Blumenthaler SV will host the 16th German Altherren-Supercup Ü32 on the local Burgwall and on other sports fields in the north of Bremen.

Stadium 

Blumenthaler SV plays its home games in the Burgwall-Stadion. The stadium has 5.000 seats and three football fields as well as a hall for futsal.

Personalities 
Blumenthaler referee Sven Jablonski has been leading Bundesliga soccer games for Blumenthaler SV since the 2017–18 season and is since the Dezember 2021 FIFA-Referee.

Christian Stoll, stadium spokesman for SV Werder Bremen, has been a member of the Blumenthaler SV for many years.

References

External links 

Das deutsche Fußball-Archiv historical German domestic league tables 
fussballdaten.de

German workers' football clubs
1919 establishments in Germany
Football clubs in Bremen (state)
Football clubs in Germany
Association football clubs established in 1919